Barry John Flick (born 5 March 1952) is a former English cricketer.  Flick was a right-handed batsman who fielded as a wicket-keeper.  He was born at Coventry, Warwickshire.

Flick made his first-class debut for Warwickshire against Cambridge University in 1969.  He made fifteen further first-class appearances for the county, the last of which came against Gloucestershire in the 1973 County Championship.  In his sixteen first-class matches, he scored a total of 46 runs at an average of 7.66, with a high score of 18.  Behind the stumps he took 17 catches and made 4 stumpings.  He made his List A debut for Warwickshire in the 1971 John Player League against Gloucestershire.  He made four further List A appearances in that season's competition, before next playing in that format in the 1973 John Player League against Lancashire.  In his six List A matches, he scored just 7 runs with a high score of 4 not out.

His brother, Clayton Flick, was one of the victims of the terrorist bombing of Pan Am flight 103 over Lockerbie in 1988.

References

External links
Barry Flick at ESPNcricinfo
Barry Flick at CricketArchive

1952 births
Living people
Cricketers from Coventry
English cricketers
Warwickshire cricketers
Wicket-keepers